Karl Leo Bengtsson (born 26 May 1998) is a Swedish professional footballer who plays as a midfielder for Aris Limassol.

Club career

Youth years
Bengtsson grew up at the island Ingarö in Värmdö Municipality, just outside Stockholm. He started his football career at the local club Ingarö IF, before joining the academy at Hammarby IF in late 2010 at age 11.

At Hammarby, he would make his way up the ranks until eventually featuring regularly at the club's U21s in 2015. During the following season he was a key player as Hammarby won the Folksam U21 Allsvenskan. In the semi-final against arch rival Djurgårdens IF in October 2016, he scored two goals while settling the score to 2–1.

Hammarby IF
On 6 September 2016, Leo Bengtsson signed his first professional contract with Hammarby IF, on a three-year deal. However, the winger did not feature in any competitive game in the 2016 Allsvenskan.

At the beginning of the 2017 season, Bengtsson made his competitive debut for Hammarby in a Svenska Cupen fixture. He came on as a substitute in a group stage away game against Nyköpings BIS on 26 February. On 9 April 2017, he made his first appearance in Allsvenskan, coming on as a substitute in a 1–1 draw against Kalmar FF on home ground. Bengtsson scored his first competitive goal for the club on 16 August, in a 3–1 win against Akropolis IF in round 2 of the 2017–18 Svenska Cupen.

During the following years, Bengtsson failed to break into Hammarby's starting eleven. In 2018, he was sent on loan to Gefle IF in Superettan, Sweden's second division. On 21 January 2019, Bengtsson renewed his contract with Hammarby for another three years.

Bengtsson spent the majority of the 2019 season at Hammarby's affiliated club IK Frej. He made 34 league appearances for Hammarby in total.

BK Häcken
On 6 January 2020, Bengtsson moved to Allsvenskan club BK Häcken from Gothenburg, signing a three-year deal. The transfer fee was reportedly set at around 1 million Swedish kronor.

International career
Bengtsson debuted for the Swedish U19 national team in a friendly against Scotland on 6 October 2016. About a month later, on 14 November 2016, he won his first competitive cap in an away qualifier against Serbia ahead of the 2017 UEFA European Under-19 Championship. Sweden won the game with a score of 3–2. Bengtsson was selected in the preliminary squad ahead of the tournament – but withdrew on request from his club, Hammarby, where he had started to play regularly.

Career statistics

Club

References

External links

1998 births
Living people
Association football midfielders
Swedish footballers
Sweden youth international footballers
Allsvenskan players
Superettan players
Hammarby Fotboll players
Gefle IF players
IK Frej players
BK Häcken players
Footballers from Stockholm